Cranford is a census-designated place (CDP) comprising the downtown part of Cranford Township, Union County, New Jersey, United States. It was first listed as a CDP prior to the 2010 census.

The CDP is bordered by Lincoln Avenue to the south and southwest, by the borough of Garwood to the west, by an unnamed stream and the Rahway River to the north and northeast, by Centennial Avenue to the east, and by Lincoln Park to the southeast. New Jersey Route 28 (North Avenue) runs through the center of downtown, as does the NJ Transit Raritan Valley Line, with access at Cranford station.

Demographics

References 

Census-designated places in Union County, New Jersey
Census-designated places in New Jersey
Cranford, New Jersey